means a man who deliberately does a ramming attack against a woman within a station precinct.

They are also called ,  and

Overview 
In May 2018, the video of a man carrying out ramming attacks one after another targeting only women within the Shinjuku Station precinct was disseminated on Twitter, YouTube, etc (video:女性に次々ぶつかる男性). In the wake of this, similar victim reports occurred one after another, and were also featured in multiple wide shows. JR East has given a heads-up on it as disruptive behaviour and has stepped up vigilance with security guards and station staff.

As for the motives for ramming, the purposes of relieving frustration, molestation and staged crash have been pointed out. Moreover, a warped feeling of justice for walking smartphones is also cited as a reason.

Types 
According to a special feature on Morning Show which aired in May 2018, they say that 'butsukari otoko' are mainly classified into the following 4 patterns.
 Following type – He follows and bumps into a woman that he targeted.
 Pick-a-fight type – When she turns around, he stands firm with his feet set apart.
 My-own-way type – He ignores the flow of people.
 Attacking type – He does things like sticking his leg out.

Arrest examples 
 September 26, 2019, Nijūbashimae Station, 49-year-old man, 3 women injured.
 July 10, 2020, Kamata Station, 45-year-old man, 6 women harmed.

Law 
In the event that they deliberately launched a ramming attack against passers-by, etc., there is a possibility that they will be charged with the following crimes.
 Battery – For the act of ramming itself.
 Bodily harm – In cases where they have wounded the other party.
 Anti-nuisance ordinance violation – In cases where molestation is the purpose.
 Deception – In cases where they pretended that their smartphones, glasses, laptops, tablet devices, luxury watches and luxury bags were damaged or got scratched, or their brand-name luxury suits and coats got a stain or were torn, pressed them for a cleaning fee, repair bill, compensation for items and payment of settlement money, and swindled them out of their cash.

In addition, there are also cases where civil claims for compensation for damages are possible. Moreover, in the event that a pregnant woman had suffered an injury, bodily harm charges can also be applied for the fetus.

See also 
 Violence against women
 Battery (crime)
 Harassment
 Random street assaults
 Molestation
 Staged crash
 Deception (criminal law)

References 

Fraud
Japanese words and phrases
Violence against women